Lithophane viridipallens, the pale green pinion moth, is a moth of the family Noctuidae that is native to North America. It is listed as a species of special concern in the US state of Connecticut. It was described by Augustus Radcliffe Grote in 1877.

References

viridipallens
Moths described in 1877